James Owens (born 1977) is an Irish hurling referee. Born in Kilrush / Askamore, County Wexford, he has become one of the top referees over the last few years and has officiated at several All-Ireland finals in minor, under-21 and club levels. He is a member of the Askamore club in Wexford. 

Owens refereed the 2015 and 2018 All-Ireland final's and was again named to referee the 2019 final.

He appeared on Prime Time in 2022.

References

1977 births
Living people
All-Ireland Senior Hurling Championship Final referees
Hurling referees